Asoriculus is an extinct genus of terrestrial shrews in the subfamily Soricinae (red-toothed shrews) and tribe Nectogalini, native to Europe and North Africa. The best known species, Asoriculus gibberodon was widespread in Europe from the Late Miocene to the Early Pleistocene. Fossils of the genus are also known from the Pliocene and Pleistocene of Morocco in North Africa. Insular species are known from the Mediterranean islands of Sicily (A. burgioi Late Pliocene-Early Pleistocene), and Corsica-Sardinia including A. corsicanus (Late Pliocene-Early Pleistocene) and A. similis (Early Pleistocene-Late Pleistocene/Holocene). A. similis likely survived into the Holocene, when it became extinct sometime after human settlement of the islands, with remains apparently being found in Mesolithic and Neolithic aged archaeological sites.

The genus Nesiotites (Late Miocene/Early Pliocene-Holocene) from the Balearic Islands of Mallorca and Menorca is considered to descend from Asoriculus, likely A. gibberodon. It includes the chronospecies N. rafelinensis (earliest Pliocene) (the validity of this species  disputed, as some authors contend that it is not morphologically distinct from N. ponsi) N. ponsi (Late Pliocene), N. meloussae/N. aff. ponsi (Early Pleistocene) and N. hidalgo (Middle Pleistocene-Holocene). These are largely distinguished by differences in body size and characters of the teeth. The insular species of Asoriculus from Corsica-Sardinia were formerly included in Nesiotites, but Nesiotites was later circumscribed to only include the Balearic species, as otherwise the genus would likely be polyphyletic. Nesiotites originally colonised Mallorca during the Late Miocene, when the Messinian salinity crisis caused the evaporation of the Mediterranean allowing animals from the Iberian Peninsula to disperse to the Balearics, and later spread to Menorca during the Pliocene-Pleistocene transition, when episodes of low sea level connected the two islands. The last Nesiotites chronospecies, N. hidalgo, became extinct shortly after human settlement of the Balearics, which occurred sometime prior to 2282 BC, with the youngest radiocarbon date for the species dating to approximately 3027 BC.

A. gibberodon has been estimated to weigh approximately 8.85 grams. The insular species of Asoriculus and Nesiotites are substantially larger than A. gibberodon and most other species of Nectogalini (with A. burgioi estimated to weigh 27.54 grams (g), and A. similis 23.68g) which has been suggested to be the result of island gigantism, with the Nesiotites lineage experiencing a gradual increase in size over time (with the estimated weight of N. ponsi being 14.58 g, while the last species, N. hildalgo being estimated at 26.63-29.31 g) being exceeded in size amongst Nectogalini only by Asiatic water shrews (Chimarrogale).

Based on DNA from Nesiotites, Asoriculus is considered to be most closely related to the Himalayan shrew (Soriculus). A molecular clock analysis suggests that Himalayan shrews and Balearic shrews diveraged approximately 6.44 million years ago.

References

Miocene first appearances
Holocene extinctions
 
Mammal genera